Socialist Party (India) (founded May, 2011) is a left-wing political party in India.

History 
In 2011, several socialist groups and individuals formed the Socialist Party (India), which intends to carry forward the legacy of the Socialist Party formed in 1948. The party was formed through a resolution passed by Mr. Pannalal Surana at the foundation conference on 28 May 2011, under the chairmanship of Prof. Keshav Rao Jadhav.

Current status 
Party National Conference held  at Wardha in Gujarath on 28–30 September 2021 elected Adv Thampan Thomas Ex MP from Kerala as president and Dr.Sandeep Pandey of  UP as General Secretary.

References

Socialist parties in India
Political parties established in 2011